Ross Henderson Paul, CM (born 1943) is a college administrator who was the fifth president and vice-chancellor of the University of Windsor. He completed his term of office as president on June 30, 2008.

A bilingual native of Montreal, Paul came to the University of Windsor as president early in 1998 immediately after serving almost seven years as president of Laurentian University in Sudbury, Ontario.

Paul holds a B.A. in mathematics and economics from Bishops University (1964), an M.A. in educational administration from McGill University (1968). He also graduated from the University of London (postgraduate certificate in education, 1965 and Ph.D., 1973).

He started his career as a teacher at Montreal’s Lower Canada College (1965–67, 1968–69). After two years at Bishop’s University, where he was alumni secretary and lecturer in the Graduate School of Education (1969–71), and following completion of his doctorate in London, he spent seven years at Dawson College in Montreal, where he held the positions of dean of arts and academic dean. Beginning in 1980, Paul spent eleven years at Alberta’s Athabasca University, ten as vice-president academic and one as acting president before assuming the presidency of Laurentian University in 1991.

Paul’s research interests include the sociology of organizations and the management of higher education. He is the author of the 1990 book, Open Learning and Open Management: Leadership and Integrity in Distance Education and the 2012 book, Leadership Under Fire: The Challenging Role of the Canadian University President.

He is a past chair of the board of World University Service of Canada (WUSC) and was founding chair of both the Optical Research Advanced Network of Ontario (ORANO) and CREAD, the distance education network for all of the Americas. He also served a term as vice-president, North America, for the International Council of Distance Education (ICDE).

Paul was a founding member of the Edmonton Summerfest Board, which created the Edmonton International Fringe Festival. He was a member of the Ontario Minister’s Advisory Committee on Arts and Culture and a national governor of the Shaw Festival. He is currently chair of the board of the Arts Club Theatre and an adjunct professor at the University of British Columbia.  He is a consultant on many aspects of higher-education management.  He plays piano and guitar and has been author of and performer in many musical revues and Fringe Theatre productions.

For his community activities, he was awarded the 125th Anniversary of the Confederation of Canada Medal in 1992, the Queen Elizabeth II Golden Jubilee Medal in 2002 and the Queen Elizabeth Diamond Jubilee Medal in 2012. He received the Bishops University Award of Merit in 2000 for contributions to higher education and Dawson College awarded him an Honorary Diploma and named its highest academic award, the Ross Paul Award, in 1980. In 2010, he was appointed a Member of the Order of Canada.

Paul is married to Dr. Jane Brindley, a psychologist, and has two sons: David (a college administrator) and Jonathan (a teacher).

References 

Dr. Ross H. Paul biography (Minister's Advisory Council for Arts and Culture) 

Living people
1943 births
Alumni of the University of London
Presidents of the University of Windsor
Presidents of Laurentian University

Members of the Order of Canada
Academic staff of Dawson College